ʾOhaloth (אוהלות, literally "Tents") is the second tractate of the Order of Tohorot in the Mishnah. It consists of eighteen chapters, which discuss the ritual impurity of corpses, and the peculiar quality they have to make all objects in the same tent-like structure impure as well.

This tractate, along with Nega'im, was considered one of the most difficult tractates; according to a Jewish legend, King David is said to have asked of God that reading the Book of Psalms be considered the equivalent of studying the tractate of Negaim and Oholot.

There is no Gemara for Oholot in either the Babylonian or Jerusalem Talmud.

Some suggest that the name of this tractate should be pronounced Ahilot (Ah-he-lote) which means "coverings" (the plural gerund) instead of Oholot which means "tents." This is because the discussion does not only focus on the transfer of tumah through tents but through other coverings as well.

References